Álvaro Rodolfo Hurtarte Aguilar (born 24 December 1981) is a Guatemalan football midfielder who plays for local club Deportivo Xinabajul in the Guatemala's top division.

Club career
Hurtarte started his professional career at hometown club Antigua GFC and has played for Marquense and Petapa as well before joining Xinabajul in 2009.

International career
He made his debut for Guatemala in a June 2004 FIFA World Cup qualification match against Surinam, coming on as a late substitute for Guillermo Ramírez. He did not win any more caps since.

External links

Profile at Todo Por El Fútbol

References

1981 births
Living people
People from Sacatepéquez Department
Guatemalan footballers
Guatemala international footballers
Deportivo Marquense players
Antigua GFC players
Association football midfielders
Deportivo Petapa players